HMS Melampus was a 46-gun modified  fifth-rate frigate built for the Royal Navy during the 1810s. Completed in 1820, she was not commissioned until 1845 for the South America Station and was converted into a store and receiving ship in 1855. The ship was briefly assigned as a coast guard ship before being paid off in 1858. Melampus was converted into a Roman Catholic chapel ship in 1866 and then became a store ship twenty years later. The ship was sold for scrap in 1906.

Description
The ship's tonnage was 1088  tons burthen. The modified Leda-class frigates were armed with twenty-eight 18-pounder cannon on her gundeck, fourteen 32-pounder carronades on her quarterdeck and a pair of 9-pounder cannon and two more 32-pounder carronades in forecastle. The ship had a crew of 315 officers and ratings.

Construction and career
Melampus, the second ship of her name to serve in the Royal Navy, was ordered on 1 May 1816, laid down in August 1817 at Pembroke Dockyard, Wales, and launched on 10 August 1820. She was completed for ordinary at Plymouth Dockyard 2–23 September 1829 and was roofed over from the mainmast forward. The ship cost £23,007 to built and £7,072 to fit out for ordinary. She was fitted out for sea at a total cost of £9,156 from March to 18 May 1845.

Melampuss first commission began on 12 March with Captain John Campbell in command and she was ready for sea on 18 May.

Notes

References
 
 

 

 

Leda-class frigates
1820 ships
Ships built in Pembroke Dock